The Ferber method, or Ferberization, is a technique invented by Richard Ferber to solve infant sleep problems. It involves "sleep-training" children to self-soothe by allowing the child to cry for a predetermined amount of time at intervals before receiving external comfort.

"Cry it out"
The "Cry It Out" (CIO) approach can be traced back to the book The Care and Feeding of Children written by Emmett Holt in 1894. CIO is any sleep-training method which allows a baby to cry for a specified period before the parent will offer comfort. "Ferberization" is one such approach. Ferber does not advocate simply leaving a baby to cry, but rather supports giving the baby time to learn to self-soothe, by offering comfort and support from the parent at predetermined intervals. The best age to attempt Ferber's sleep training method is around 6 months-old.

Other CIO methods, such as Marc Weissbluth's extinction method, are often mistakenly referred to as "Ferberization", though they fall outside of the guidelines Ferber recommended. "Ferberization" is referred to as graduated extinction by Weissbluth. Some pediatricians feel that any form of CIO is unnecessary and damaging to a baby.

Ferberization summarized
Ferber discusses and outlines a wide range of practices to teach an infant to sleep. The term Ferberization is now popularly used to refer to the following techniques:

 Take steps to prepare the baby to sleep. This includes night-time rituals and day-time activities.
 At bedtime, leave the child in bed and leave the room.
 Return at progressively increasing intervals to comfort the baby, but do not pick them up. For example, on the first night, some scenarios call for returning first after three minutes, then after five minutes, and thereafter each ten minutes, until the baby is asleep.
 Each subsequent night, return at intervals longer than the night before. For example, the second night may call for returning first after five minutes, then after ten minutes, and thereafter each twelve minutes, until the baby is asleep.

The technique is targeted at infants as young as four months of age. A few babies are capable of sleeping through the night at three months, and some are capable of sleeping through the night at six months. Before six months of age, the baby may still need to feed during the night and all babies will require a night feeding before three months.

Criticism
A study that looked at long-term consequences in children older than seven months concluded that there were no beneficial nor negative effects to sleep training, but did not test the cry-it-out method. It tests two other gentler methods, including the camping out method. Co-sleeping is a common alternative that comes with its own risks and benefits.

In popular culture
In the film Meet the Fockers, Robert De Niro's character tries to use the Ferber method in teaching his grandson. It ended up not working due to Roz comforting Little Jack.
In the Modern Family episode "Up All Night", Mitchell is trying to ferberize his daughter Lily while his boyfriend Cameron is against it. In "Catch of the Day" it is mentioned that Haley was also Ferberized.
In the Degrassi: The Next Generation episode “Need You Now: Part One”, KC finds out that the family who adopted his son is utilizing the Ferber method.
In the Raising Hope episode "Sleep Training", Hope's grandparents try to sleep-train her.
In the Mad About You episode "The Conversation", Jamie convinces Paul to go one night with the Ferber method. Through the process they confront the moral and psychologic ramifications. The whole episode was done in a single take.
In the White Collar episode "Taking Stock", Mozzie accuses Diana Berrigan's nanny Karen of being a Ferberizer.
In the season 5, episode 4 This Is Us episode "Honestly", Jack tries to convince Rebecca that the "cry it out" method is the only way to help a restless baby Kevin sleep, as he needs to learn to soothe himself. In the same way, Kevin is shown overcoming difficult situations from his teenage and adult life on his own.
In the House episode ”The Down Low”, an acquaintance of the patient briefly discusses the Ferber method with Thirteen.
In the Psych episode “Rob-A-Bye Baby”, Burton Guster disapproves of a nanny who is unfamiliar with the Ferber method. 
in the film Confess, Fletch, the title character makes reference to the "Ferberization Method" to a police inspector experiencing sleep deprivation during an interrogation.

See also 

 Swaddling

References

Further reading

External links
 The Ferber Method Helps Some Children Sleep Longer clinical bottom lines and summary of key evidence, 1999. University of Michigan Health System, Department of Pediatrics.

Sleep
Parenting
1985 introductions